The Hasty Pudding Club, often referred to simply as the Pudding, is a social club at Harvard University, and one of three sub-organizations that comprise the Hasty Pudding - Institute of 1770. The club's motto, Concordia Discors (discordant harmony), derives from the epistles of the Latin poet Horace.

The year of founding for the club is usually given as 1795, when a group of undergraduates came together "to cherish feelings of friendship and patriotism," or as 1770, the founding year for the Institute of 1770, an organization that the Pudding absorbed in 1924. By way of this amalgamation, the Pudding claims to be the oldest collegiate social club in the United States.

Historically, the club has been noted for its "prestigious" reputation and viewed as "the first step towards final club membership." An 1870 travel book lists the Hasty Pudding Club and the Porcellian Club as "the two lions of Harvard."

History
The society was founded on September 1, 1795, by a 15-year-old Harvard College student, Horace Binney, who called together a meeting of 21 juniors in the room of Nymphas Hatch. The club is named for hasty pudding, a traditional English dish popular at that time in America that the founding members ate at their first meeting. Each week two members, chosen in alphabetical order, had to provide a pot of hasty pudding for the club to enjoy.

Originally, the club engaged in holding mock trials, which became more elaborate over time. This culminated in a member, Lemuel Hayward, secretly planning to stage a musical on the night he was to host the club's meeting. On December 13, 1844, Hayward and other members staged Bombastes Furioso in room 11 of Hollis Hall, which began the Hasty Pudding Theatricals.

Throughout its history, the Hasty Pudding Club has absorbed other organizations. In 1924, the Club absorbed the Institute of 1770, D.K.E. In 2012, the Hasty Pudding Club, Hasty Pudding Theatricals, and The Harvard Krokodiloes merged into a single entity: The Hasty Pudding - Institute of 1770.

The Hasty Pudding Club is the only social club on campus that is coed and has members from all four years. Students gain membership in the club by attending a series of lunches, cocktail parties, and other gatherings—which are referred to as the punch process.  The club holds its social activities in a clubhouse near Harvard Square. These include weekly Members' Nights, dinner and cocktail parties, as well as its elaborate theme parties, such as Leather and Lace. The current clubhouse contains rooms with specific purposes—such as The Arena, the club's game room, which has no windows or openings to the outside.

See also
National Register of Historic Places listings in Cambridge, Massachusetts

References

External links

Clubhouses on the National Register of Historic Places in Massachusetts
Harvard University
Clubs and societies in Massachusetts
Buildings and structures in Cambridge, Massachusetts
Harvard Square
National Register of Historic Places in Cambridge, Massachusetts
1795 establishments in the United States
Organizations established in 1795